= Tobago FA Cup =

National football tournament

Tobago FA Cup is the foremost association football tournament in Tobago, Trinidad and Tobago.

== Previous winners ==
- 2000 : Grafton Stokely Vale 2-1 King David Enterprise Goal City
- 2001 : Charlotteville Unifiers
- 2002 : FC Phoenix 1-1 St. Clair's C.S. [5-4 pen]
- 2003 : Stokely Vale 2-1 Georgia [asdet]
- 2004 : St. Clair's C.S. 2-0 Sidey's FC
- 2005 : Roxborough Lakers 3-2 Pepsi Hills United
- 2006 : St. Clair's C.S. 4-1 Charlotteville Unifiers
- 2007 : Roxborough Lakers
- 2008 : Roxborough Lakers 4-1 Charlotteville Unifiers
- 2009 : Stokely Vale 2-0 1976 Phoenix
